Joachim Irgens von Westervick (Danish: Joachim Irgens von Westervick; spelled also af Westervig and af Vestervig) (19 May 1611 - 29 August 1675), born as Jochum Jürgens, was a Dano-Norwegian nobleman, a Danish official and an estate owner in Denmark, Norway, and the Netherlands. Between 1666 and 1675 he owned the norwegian Irgens Estate as a private estate. The Danish variant of his name by birth was Joachim Irgens.

Biography

Early life and family 
Joachim Jürgens was the son of merchant Heinrich Jürgens and Catharina Fruchtnichts in Itzehoe in Holstein. He married in 1656 Cornelia Bicker (1629–1708), the daughter of Andries Bicker, Mayor of Amsterdam. Through his marriage he became a cousin-in-law of the Dutch politician elite like Johan de Witt and Andries de Graeff, and also of Jacob de Petersen, another nordic politician who come to the Dutch Republic and associated with the Amsterdam oligarchy by marriage. De Petersen married Catharina Bicker (1642–1678), granddaughter of Andries Bicker.

Like his brother Johannes Jürgens (Irgens), he studied medicine. However, after having travelled around the world, Irgens became in 1634 the Lord Chamberlain of King Christian IV of Denmark and Norway and later Frederick III of Denmark and Norway.

Land estates and business 
Joachim Irgens was early involved as an owner of various mines, among others Røros Copper Works.

Due to in the 1650s having provided the King's wars with considerable amounts of deliveries, Joachim Irgens received as payment, on 12 January 1666, all the crown estate in Helgeland, Salten, Lofoten, Vesterålen, Andenes, Senja, and Troms in Norway. The so called Irgens Estate was and is the biggest single sale of land ever to happen in the Nordic countries. This sale represented 50 percent of all property in Northern Norway, and the value was calculated to 100,000 riksdaler, equivalent to 2,700 kilogrammes of gold. Together with the properties, Irgens got the right to all annual rent fees as well as e.g. tithe, the Lap tax and leidang.

He had estates also in Denmark (among others his seat Vestervig), the Netherlands, and the Eastern Indies.

Ennoblement 
On 4 October 1674, Joachim Irgens was ennobled as Baron under the name von Westervick, thus becoming a member of the Danish and the Norwegian nobility.

Loss of land estates 
Joachim von Westervick died in Copenhagen 1675. He was then bankrupt, wherefore the estates were dissolved. For example, his properties in Helgeland were sold to Lorentz Mortensen Angell in Trondheim. His widow managed to buy back some of the land, among other the Tromsø Estate, and remained standing as a proprietarian until her death in 1708. Some properties were then inherited by Baron Jacob de Petersen from Amsterdam.

See also
 Danish nobility
 Norwegian nobility
 Irgens Estate

Literature and sources 
 Store norske leksikon: Joachim Irgens, Joachim Irgens – utdypning

1611 births
1675 deaths
17th-century Danish landowners
17th-century Norwegian nobility
17th-century Danish nobility